Habib Kot is a village in Shikarpur district of Sindh province in Pakistan.

Habib Kot is famous for its railway station located on Rohri - Quetta railway line. It is the junction of Kotri - Habib Kot via Dadu and Larkana branch railway line.

References

Populated places in Shikarpur District